iDroid USA was founded in 2014 as a smartphone and Tablet PC manufacturer with its main Headquarter in Houston, Texas, USA. iDroid started as an R&D firm with an initial product focus on Android based Tablet PCs and launched their first array of Tablets.

In first quarter of 2014, iDroid launched its first large 5” screen sized Smartphone under its smart phone line "Tango". In October 2014, iDroid launched its largest Phablet with a 5.5” screen and updated Android Kitkat OS with Wake-up Gestures technology.

iDroid uses its own sound enhancing technology called iDro Beast in selected tablets and smart phones. iDROID USA has also recently launched its first Smartwatch and another Smartphone with the most unusual feature of front camera flash which is one of its only kind in the market as yet.

Global presence 1 
iDroid USA has two distribution centers in the United States. One is located in Philadelphia, Pennsylvania, and the other in Houston, Texas.

iDroid officially launched in Europe in Q4 2014. iDroid has sales and marketing offices along with local distribution offices in Benelux and Antwerp.

iDroid launched its operations in Toronto, Ontario, Canada, in September 2014. There are two distribution offices in Canada, one based in Toronto, and the other based in Vancouver, British Columbia.

iDroid USA officially launched in Uganda on 1 January 2015 with a retailer channel signup campaign in Kampala, the Ugandan capital. iDroid also launched their massive TV media campaign and signed up Jose Chameleon as its brand ambassador.

In July 2015, iDroid launches its brand anthem song called iDroid Town produced by local musicians. The song hit the top charts within weeks of release.
 
In January 2016, iDroid Mobile launched its operations in Kenya. iDroid also launched operations in 2016 in Monterrey Mexico.

iDroid Mobile launched two smart phones Balr X7 and Balr X7 Pro in partnership with Yayvo.com, a Pakistan-based online ecommerce marketplace in March 2017. iDroid Platinum P9, a flagship model was introduced through Daraz.pk in January 2018.

Device product sheet

References

Electronics companies of the United States
Technology companies of the United States
Manufacturing companies based in Houston
American companies established in 2012
Technology companies established in 2012
Telecommunications companies established in 2012
2012 establishments in Texas